RK Prespa (HC Prespa) is a team handball club from Resen, North Macedonia. The team won a Macedonian Handball Championship in the 1996–97 season under the name Jafa Promet Resen. They compete in the Macedonian Handball Super League.

Accomplishments
 Macedonian Handball Super League 
Winners (1): 1996–97
 EHF Champions League Group Stage: 1 
 1997–98
 EHF Cup 1/8 Final: 1 
 1996–97

References

External links
 RFM Profile
 EHF Profile
 Macedonian Handball Federation

Prespa
Resen Municipality